This is a List of Hindu temples in Poland, by location.

Czarnów
New Shantipur (Nowe Śantipur) ISKCON (since 1980, the oldest Hindu temple in Poland).

Shiva Temple

Mysiadło near Warsaw
New Ramana Reti (Nowe Ramana Reti), ISKCON, since 1989.

Warsaw
Shree Vara Lakshmi Narshingadev (Śri Wara Lakszmi Narszingadew), Bhakti Marga Foundation, since 2009.
 Hindu Bhawan Temple, Kolonia Warszawska.
 Akshardham Temple Warsaw.
 Krishna Temple, Warsaw.

Wrocław

New Navadvip (Nowe Nawadwip) ISKCON, since 1998.

See also 
 Lists of Hindu temples by country
 List of Hindu temples outside India
 List of large Hindu temples

References

Poland
Hinduism in Poland
!
Hindu temples